This page provides a list of novelists who have written historical novels. Countries named are where they worked for longer periods. Alternative names appear before the dates.

A

B

C

D

E

F

G

H

I

J

K

L

M

N

O

P

Q
John Quigley (1925–2021, Scotland)

R

S

T

U

V

W

Y

Z

See also
List of writers

Historical novelists